is a Japanese freelance manga artist and illustrator. She is best known for her Witch Hat Atelier series. She has created variant covers and other illustrations for Marvel Comics, DC Comics, and stories in the Star Wars franchise. She did the character designs for The Elder, part of the Star Wars: Visions short film series released in 2021, and she wrote the 2022 manga adaptation for it.

She has won and been nominated for multiple awards, including the Eisner Award, the Harvey Award, the Kodansha Manga Award, the Manga Taishō, the Daruma d'or manga at the Japan Expo Awards, the Mangawa Award, and the Prix Babelio.

Biography
Shirahama was born on May 7. She graduated from the design program at the Tokyo University of the Arts. She works using analog tools such as pencils, pen and ink, and colored pencils rather than digital tools. Influences on her work include The Lord of the Rings and Harry Potter novels, which she read in junior high school, as well as the Art Nouveau and Art Deco styles. Her art style has multiple influences, including Alphonse Mucha, Mœbius, Hayao Miyazaki, and Moto Hagio. 

She made her multi-part story publishing debut with Eniale & Dewiela in Fellows! in 2012. The series ran for two years, ending in July 2015, and was collected in three volumes released in June 2013, June 2014, and July 2015. The series was translated into French and released by Pika Édition in 2019.

She began doing variant covers and other illustration and concept work for Marvel Comics, DC Comics, and Star Wars comics in 2015 after her art was noticed at New York Comic-Con, working on titles such as Star Wars: Doctor Aphra, Deadpool, and Batgirl and the Birds of Prey. Witch Hat Atelier began serialization in Kodansha's Monthly Morning Two manga magazine in July 2016. When the first collected volume was released in January 2017, the manga was so popular it became hard to find copies in stores.

In June 2022, her Star Wars manga short work, The Elder, was published in Big Gangan. She also did the character designs for the animated version of the story.

Bibliography
  in Fellows! (2011, one-shot, Enterbrain)
  in Fellows! (2013–2015, 3 volumes, Kadokawa)
 Witch Hat Atelier (2016–present, 10 volumes, Kodansha)
 Witch Hat Kitchen with art by Hiromi Satō (spin-off series, 2019–present, 4 volumes, Kodansha)
I Am Gandhi with text by Brad Meltzer (2018, Penguin Random House)
  (November 2019, Kodansha)
 Star Wars: Visions: The Elder (May 25, 2022, in the June 2022 issue of Big Gangan, Square Enix)

Cover art
  (April 2011, Ohzora Publishing)
  (July 2011, Enterbrain)
 Batgirl and the Birds of Prey, variant covers for issues #1-19, 21-22 (2016–2018, DC Comics)
 Star Wars: Doctor Aphra, cover art for issues #5-6, 9-13, and collected volume #2 (2017–2018, Marvel Comics)
 Star Wars: The Last Jedi, cover art for issue #2 (May 2018, Marvel Comics)
 Nightwing (2016 series), variant cover for issue #52 (November 2018, DC Comics)
 Shazam! (2018 series), variant cover for issue #6 (June 2019, DC Comics)
 Wonder Woman (2016 series), variant cover for issue #63 (January 2019, DC Comics)

Reception
Jérôme Briot of Zoo magazine praised the "swirling graphics and rare elegance" in Eniale & Dewiela, citing Shirahama's artistic inspiration from Alphone Mucha-esque Art Nouveau style. The French website, Manga-News, said the storyline sometimes moved too quickly, jumping straight into the story without any setup. Because the individual stories in the series are fairly short, big ideas are often left unexplored. Despite those flaws, Shirahama often surprised them with "a lot of imagination and crazy little ideas...surprises...[and] even a little emotion". The site praised her mixing and tweaking of various religious themes throughout the series, the chemistry between the two polar-opposite main characters, the quality of the artwork, and design and composition of the pages.

James Davis Nicoll at Tor.com described Shirahama's artwork in the Witch Hat Atelier manga as "sumptuous" and "evocative", and gave her "high marks for plausible magic". Rebecca Silverman at Anime News Network praised Shirahama's subtle characterization, stating that "all of the characters have layers to their personalities". She goes on to praise the "strong writing [that] is ably enhanced by truly beautiful artwork", stating that "you don't want to miss" it. 

Her work on Witch Hat Atelier was described as "breathtaking" by Kelly Chu, who compared it favorably with the Studio Ghibli film Spirited Away. The Young Adult Library Services Association (YALSA) of the American Library Association ranked Witch Hat Atelier as one of the "Top 10 Graphic Novels for Teens" in 2020 and 2021. Her art was described by the French website, Manga-News, as "striking" and having an "extensive visual look", with "sharp shading imitating and engraving style". As of April 2022, the manga series had over 2.5 million copies in circulation worldwide.

Selected awards and honors
Shirahama has been nominated for and won multiple awards.

References

Eisner Award winners
Fantasy artists
Harvey Award winners
Japanese women illustrators
Science fiction artists
Winner of Kodansha Manga Award (General)
Women manga artists
Writers who illustrated their own writing
Year of birth missing (living people)
Living people